Gruszki may refer to the following places:
Gruszki, Lesser Poland Voivodeship (south Poland)
Gruszki, Augustów County in Podlaskie Voivodeship (north-east Poland)
Gruszki, Hajnówka County in Podlaskie Voivodeship (north-east Poland)